Hendrik Jacobus Marais (born ) is a South African rugby union player for the Russian club Enisei-STM in the European Rugby Challenge Cup. His regular position is centre.

References

South African rugby union players
Living people
1993 births
People from Lichtenburg
Rugby union centres
Leopards (rugby union) players
Pumas (Currie Cup) players
Rugby union players from North West (South African province)